Amy Hoffman (born 1952) is a writer, educator, and community activist.

Early life 
Hoffman was born to a traditional Jewish family. She was the eldest of six children, and grew up in Rutherford, New Jersey.

Hoffman graduated from Brandeis University in 1976.

Career 
Hoffman worked as an editor for Boston's Gay Community News from 1978 to 1982. As features editor, she was responsible for putting together the June 1979 Stonewall tenth anniversary issue.

Hoffman published her first book, Hospital Time, in 1997, with a forward by Urvashi Vaid. The book recollects her friendship with Mike Riegle in the wake of his death from AIDS.

In 2007, Hoffman wrote the memoir An Army of Ex-Lovers about her time as an editor for Gay Community News. The memoir was met with positive reviews in LGBT and mainstream media, and was a finalist for the Publishing Triangle Judy Grahn Award and a Lambda Book Award in 2008.

Hoffman was editor-in-chief of Women's Review of Books from 2003 to 2004 and from 2006 to 2018. Women's Review of Books had shut down between these periods due to lack of financing; Hoffman was the party most responsible for reviving the magazine.

Personal life 
Amy Hoffman is married to Roberta Stone.

Publications

Memoirs

Novels

References 

1952 births
Brandeis University alumni
American lesbian writers
Living people
People from Rutherford, New Jersey
Place of birth missing (living people)
20th-century American newspaper editors
American women memoirists
21st-century American novelists
American women novelists
American LGBT novelists
LGBT people from New Jersey